The Shire of Nanango was a local government area located in the South Burnett region of Queensland, Australia, about  northwest of the capital, Brisbane.

History

Barambah Division was created on 11 November 1879 as one of 74 divisions around Queensland under the Divisional Boards Act 1879 with a population of 1539.

On 23 February 1882, there was a realignment of boundaries between Wambo Division and Barambah Division, involving subdivision 3 of Wambo Division and subdivisions 1 and 2 of Barambah Division.

Kilkivan Division was created on 1 July 1886 from the western part of the Widgee Division and part of the Barambah Division under the Divisional Boards Act 1879. However, the changes to Widgee's boundaries were not welcomed by the Widgee Divisional Board; they felt so much territory had been removed from Widgee Division that it was effectively abolished and the board members all threatened to resign in protest. The government then hastily abolished Kilkivan Division on 30 July 1886, only four weeks after it was created, leading to protests by the residents of Kilkivan. Arguments about boundaries continued for a year. Kilkivan Division was eventually re-constituted on 17 November 1887, comprising part of No. 2 subdivision of Widgee Division and part of the No. 2 subdivision and all of the No. 3 subdivision of Barambah Division, to be governed by a board of six members.

In 1888, Barambah Division was renamed Nanango Division.

With the passage of the Local Authorities Act 1902, the Nanango Division became the Shire of Nanango on 31 March 1903.

On 15 March 2008, under the Local Government (Reform Implementation) Act 2007 passed by the Parliament of Queensland on 10 August 2007, the Shire of Nanango merged with the Shires of Kingaroy, Murgon and Wondai to form the South Burnett Regional Council.

Towns
The Shire of Nanango included the following settlements:

 Nanango
 Benarkin
 Blackbutt
 Brooklands
 Bunya Mountains
 Maidenwell

Population

Chairmen
 1909: E. G. Lord 
 1920: John Archibald Lee 
 1926: John Archibald Lee

References

Former local government areas of Queensland
1879 establishments in Australia
2008 disestablishments in Australia
Populated places disestablished in 2008